In applied mathematics and mathematical analysis, the fractal derivative or Hausdorff derivative is a non-Newtonian generalization of the derivative dealing with the measurement of fractals, defined in fractal geometry. Fractal derivatives were created for the study of anomalous diffusion, by which traditional approaches fail to factor in the fractal nature of the media. A  fractal measure t is scaled according to tα. Such a derivative is local, in contrast to the similarly applied fractional derivative. Fractal calculus is formulated as a generalized of standard calculus

Physical background

Porous media, aquifers, turbulence, and other media usually exhibit fractal properties. Classical diffusion or dispersion laws based on random walks in free space (essentially the same result variously known as Fick's laws of diffusion, Darcy's law, and Fourier's law) are not applicable to fractal media. To address this, concepts such as distance and velocity must be redefined for fractal media; in particular, scales for space and time are to be transformed according to (xβ, tα). Elementary physical concepts such as velocity are redefined as follows for fractal spacetime (xβ, tα):

,

where Sα,β represents the fractal spacetime with scaling indices α and β. The traditional definition of velocity makes no sense in the non-differentiable fractal spacetime.

Definition 

Based on above discussion, the concept of the fractal derivative of a function u(t) with respect to a  fractal measure t has been introduced as follows:
,

A more general definition is given by

.
For a function y(t) on -perfect fractal set F the fractal derivative or -derivative of at t, is defined by
.

Motivation
The derivatives of a function f can be defined in terms of the coefficients ak in the Taylor series expansion:

From this approach one can directly obtain:

This can be generalized approximating f with functions (xα-(x0)α)k:

note: the lowest order coefficient still has to be b0=f(x0), since it's still the constant approximation of the function f at x0.

Again one can directly obtain:

The Fractal Maclaurin series of f(t) with fractal support F is as follows:

Properties

Expansion coefficients 
Just like in the Taylor series expansion, the coefficients bk can be expressed in terms of the fractal derivatives of order k of f:

Proof idea: assuming  exists, bk can be written as 

one can now use   and since

Connection with Derivative 
If for a given function f both the derivative Df and the fractal derivative Dαf exists, one can find an analog to the chain rule:

The last step is motivated by the Implicit function theorem which, under appropriate conditions, gives us dx/dxα = (dxα/dx)−1

Similarly for the more general definition:

Application in anomalous diffusion

As an alternative modeling approach to the classical Fick's second law, the fractal derivative is used to derive a linear anomalous transport-diffusion equation underlying anomalous diffusion process,

where 0 < α < 2, 0 < β < 1, and δ(x) is the Dirac delta function.

In order to obtain the fundamental solution, we apply the transformation of variables

then the equation (1) becomes the normal diffusion form equation, the solution of (1) has the stretched Gaussian form:

The mean squared displacement of above fractal derivative diffusion equation has the asymptote:

Fractal-fractional calculus

The fractal derivative is connected to the classical derivative if the first derivative of the function under investigation exists. In this case,
.
However, due to the differentiability property of an integral, fractional derivatives are differentiable, thus the following new concept was introduced

The following differential operators were introduced and applied very recently. Supposing that y(t) be continuous and fractal differentiable on (a, b) with order β, several definitions of a fractal–fractional derivative of y(t) hold with order α in the Riemann–Liouville sense:
Having power law type kernel:

Having exponentially decaying type kernel:
,
Having generalized Mittag-Leffler type kernel:

The above differential operators each have an associated fractal-fractional integral operator, as follows:
Power law type kernel:

Exponentially decaying type kernel:
.
Generalized Mittag-Leffler type kernel:
.
FFM is refereed to fractal-fractional with the generalized Mittag-Leffler kernel.

Fractal non-local calculus

Fractal analogue of the right-sided Riemann-Liouville fractional integral of order  of f is defined by:
.
Fractal analogue of the left-sided Riemann-Liouville fractional integral of order  of f is defined by:

Fractal analogue of the right-sided Riemann-Liouville fractional derivative of order  of f is defined by:

Fractal analogue of the left-sided Riemann-Liouville fractional derivative of order  of f is defined by:

Fractal analogue of the right-sided Caputo fractional derivative of order  of f is defined by:

Fractal analogue of the left-sided Caputo fractional derivative of order  of f is defined by:

See also
 Fractional calculus
 Fractional-order system
 Multifractal system

References

External links
Power Law & Fractional Dynamics
Non-Newtonian calculus website

Fractals
Applied mathematics
Non-Newtonian calculus
Mathematical analysis